Faizullapur is a village in the amloh tehsil in the fatehgarh district of Punjab, India.147203

Population 
Faizullapur has a total population of about 1802 (roughly 605 males and 598+ females). About 400 people come under Scheduled Cast (SC). There is a total of about 350 families in Faizullapur, according to government figures.

Places of worship 
Prakash Divas of Guru Nanak Dev  are the major events, which people from all over join in.

 Gurudwara sahib: This Gurudwara is a holy place for Sikhs, but everyone is welcome. Every month on the day of SANGRAD there is a programme. Every year on the birthday of Guru Nanak Dev ji, Parbhat Feri is held.
Mandir: There is one mandir (temple), as well, where people hold programmes from time to time.
Masjid: There is one masjid (mosque) as well. Every year there is a programme held at the mosque; Qawwals attend and sing devotional music.

See also
 Singhpuria Misl

External links
 Facebook
 Blogspot
admin Hargobind singh jaria

Villages in Fatehgarh Sahib district